The 1900–01 Penn Quakers men's ice hockey season was the 4th season of play for the program.

Season
With the reopening of the West Park Ice Palace, the Quakers ice hockey team was able to return as well. The club rejoined the Intercollegiate Hockey Association.

The team did not have a head coach but J. A. Standen served as team manager.

After the season the West Park Ice Palace burned down, leaving the team without a home. Due to the expense of keeping up the team, and the large debt of the athletic department, the ice hockey program was mothballed for several years.

Roster

Standings

Schedule and Results

|-
!colspan=12 style=";" | Regular Season

Note: Games with no score were scheduled but it's unclear whether or not they were played.† Brown records the score of the game as 6–2.

References

Penn Quakers men's ice hockey seasons
Penn
Penn
Penn
Penn